Fosna-Folket is a newspaper published in Brekstad, Norway. It covers the district of Fosen, including the municipalities of Ørland, Bjugn, Rissa, Åfjord, Leksvik, Roan and Osen. The newspaper is published three days a week: Tuesdays, Thursdays an Fridays. In 2009, it had a circulation of 7,314. The newspaper is owned by Adresseavisen.

References

Newspapers published in Norway
Companies based in Trøndelag
Fosen
Mass media in Trøndelag
Polaris Media